Flora Le Breton (1899 – 11 July 1951 in Brooklyn, New York City) was an English silent film actress from Croydon, Surrey, England. She was a dainty blonde with dark blue eyes. In the UK she was called both the British Mary Pickford and the English Mary Pickford.

Lineage and family
Her ancestry was English, French, Scottish and Irish. Her Scottish lineage was lengthy and distinguished. She was related to Archibald Campbell, 2nd Earl of Argyll. Her ancestral home, Ware Park, dated to the 15th century. Flora Annie Le Breton was the youngest child of a gentleman of private means, Bertram Le Breton (born 1870), and his wife, and Florence Evelyn Le Breton. She had a sister called Violet (born 1897) and their brother was named Vivian Bertram Le Breton (born 1898). In August 1918, her brother, Lieutenant Vivian Le Breton, who had just weeks before married a Miss Theodora Fairbrother,  was killed in action while fighting in France during World War I. Her sister Violet married Major Cecil Haigh and settled in Hong Kong.

Education and stage career
She trained for the stage at the Royal Academy of Dramatic Art in London. Le Breton earned a scholarship there at the age of fifteen. Founded by Sir Herbert Tree, the academy grant was presented to her by Sir Squire Bancroft and Sir John Hare.

She secured the role of a London flower girl and played opposite Sir Gerald du Maurier for an entire year in the English capital. She was noticed by Andre Charlot, who envisioned her as an English soubrette. He put Le Breton in several revues in which she sang and
performed a stiff-legged doll dance that became the highlight of the shows.

Film actress
Le Breton's film career began in 1920 with a role as Alesia in La Poupee. In 1922 she co-starred with George K. Arthur and Simeon Stuart in Love's Influence, originally titled Love's April. The French heavyweight boxer, Georges Carpentier, made a cameo appearance in the British silent film. Le Breton won many of the London film favourite contests along with actress Betty Balfour. She appeared in the first coloured film made in Great Britain. The Glorious Adventure (1922) starred Lady Diana Cooper and Victor McLaglen. Produced by J. Stuart Blackton, founder of Vitagraph Studios, the film was made in Prizma colour.

As a dancer Le Breton and her partner, Cecil Rubens, won the world's amateur dancing championship in February 1923.

Le Breton arrived in America in January 1924. Among her early Hollywood films is Another Scandal (1924). She had the third lead after Lois Wilson and Holmes Herbert. Shot in Florida, the film was a production of the Tilford Cinema Corporation. Le Breton was among those considered for the role of Peter Pan in Peter Pan, which was adapted from the novel by Sir James Barrie. She chose not to play additional parts like the vamp character, Mrs. May Beamish, she performed in Another Scandal. She appeared in the melodrama I Am The Man (1924) with Lionel Barrymore. Her last screen credit came in the Columbia Pictures comedy Charley's Aunt (1930). Le Breton played the part of Ela Delahay.

Le Breton sent for her mother in Britain and settled her in Beverly Hills, California after she became a star in the US.

American stage
In her first year in the United States, Le Breton acted the part of a waif who inherits the wealth of a long-lost grandfather, Lord Maxwell. The play was Lass o' Laughter. Her character necessitates that she enunciate a Glaswegian Scottish accent. A reviewer praised her appearance, commenting Miss Le Breton's beauty is of the Dresden doll type. In November 1925 she was featured in the Henry W. Savage production, The Balcony Walker, which played the Lyric Theatre in Bridgeport, Connecticut. By March 1926 she had given up her film career to appear in a New York City revue, The Optimists. In a 1928 play, she was Lady Delphine, the romantic object of song and dance man Charles King in the well-received Broadway show, Present Arms, which had a run of 155 performances at the Mansfield Theatre. In March 1929, Walter Winchell, in his gossip column "Diary of a New Yorker,"<ref>'Harrisburg Telegraph page 10, Harrisburg, Pennsylvania, 5 March 1929.</ref> recounted Miss Le Breton's theatrical struggle to win stardom in America, and noted that she was now "the headliner and sensation of the bill at a vaudeville theater."

In 1933, Le Breton was reviewed favourably for her role in the School For Husbands, which was produced by the Theatre Guild. Included in the cast were Osgood Perkins and June Walker.

Selected Broadway performancesLass o' Laughter (Comedy Theatre, New York, 28 performances, January – February 1928)The Optimists (Casino de Paris, New York, 24 performances, January – February 1928)Present Arms (Lew Fields' Mansfield Theatre, New York, 155 performances, 26 April to 1 September 1928)The Singing Rabbi (Selwyn Theatre, New York, 3 performances, 10–12 September 1931)The Cat and the Fiddle (Globe Theatre, N.Y., and then moved to George M. Cohan's Theatre, N.Y., 395 performances, 15 October 1931 to 24 September 1932)The School for Husbands (Empire Theatre, New York, 116 performances, 16 October 1932 to 20 January 1934)The Chinese Nightingale (Theatre of Young America, New York, 8 performances, October 1934)

Selected filmography

 Cocaine (UK, 1922)
 A Soul's Awakening (UK, 1922)
 A Gipsy Cavalier (UK, 1922)
 Love's Influence (UK, 1922)
 I Will Repay (UK, 1923)
 Little Miss Nobody (UK, 1923)
 Another Scandal (US, 1924)
 Those Who Judge (US, 1924)
 I Am the Man (US, 1924)
 Lover's Island (US, 1924) with Hope Hampton and James Kirkwood
 The White Monkey (1925)
 Lover's Island (1925)
 Tons of Money (UK, 1926)
 Education of a Prince (France, 1927)
 The Rolling Road (UK, 1928)
 Charley's Aunt (US, 1930) with Charles Ruggles

References

Further reading
 Barnard Bulletin, Here And There About Town, 17 November 1933, Page 2.
 Bridgeport Telegram, Amusements, Monday, 16 November 1925, Page 6.
 Galveston Daily News, At The Dixie, Wednesday, 11 March 1931, Page 3.
 Los Angeles Times, Here To Conquer Filmdom, 15 January 1924, Page 24.
 Los Angeles Times, A Town Called Hollywood, 26 July 1931, Page B13.
 The New York Times, Around The Film World, 20 July 1924, Page X2.
 The New York Times, New Plays in the Province, 16 November 1924, Page X2.
 The New York Times, Who's Who on the Stage, 11 January 1925, Page X2.
 Ogden, Utah Standard-Examiner, Put on the Gloves Again Georges!, Says Mrs. Carpentier, Sunday Morning, 15 October 1922, Page 36.
 Syracuse Herald, Here, There and Everywhere, 18 February 1923, Page 67.
 Zanesville, Ohio Times Recorder, Her Beauty Didn't Conquer Hollywood'', 9 March 1926, Page 1.

External links

English film actresses
English silent film actresses
English stage actresses
Vaudeville performers
1899 births
People from Croydon
1951 deaths
20th-century English actresses
20th-century English singers
British expatriate actresses in the United States
20th-century English women singers